The 1963 Southern Conference men's basketball tournament took place from February 28 to March 2, 1963, at the Richmond Arena in Richmond, Virginia. The West Virginia Mountaineers, led by head coach George King, won their eighth Southern Conference title and received the automatic berth to the 1963 NCAA tournament.

Format 
The top eight finishers  of the conference's nine members were eligible for the tournament. The teams were seeded based on conference winning percentage. The tournament used a preset bracket consisting of three rounds.

Bracket 

* Overtime game

See also 
 List of Southern Conference men's basketball champions

References 

Tournament
Southern Conference men's basketball tournament
Southern Conference men's basketball tournament
Southern Conference men's basketball tournament
Southern Conference men's basketball tournament